Pyotr Aleksandrovich Nemov (born 18 October 1983) is a Russian former footballer who played as a midfielder.

Club career
He made his Russian Premier League debut for FC Dynamo Moscow on 13 August 2000 in a game against FC Uralan Elista.

He was the youngest player to score a goal in the Russian Premier League for FC Dynamo Moscow (he scored on 19 May 2001 against FC Rotor Volgograd at the age of 17 years, 7 months and 1 day), until that mark was surpassed by Aleksandr Kokorin in 2008.

External links
 
 
  Player page on the official FC Saturn Moscow Oblast website
 

1983 births
Sportspeople from Oryol
Living people
Russian footballers
Russia youth international footballers
Russia under-21 international footballers
Association football midfielders
FC Dynamo Moscow players
FC Spartak Moscow players
PFC Krylia Sovetov Samara players
FC Saturn Ramenskoye players
Russian Premier League players
FC Rubin Kazan players
FC Tom Tomsk players